Brett Sharman (born 18 January 1987) is a professional South African rugby footballer. His preferred position was at hooker.

Early life 
Sharman was born in Westville, Durban in 1987. He moved to Johannesburg where he attended Bryanston Primary School in Bryanston. He later attended Pretoria Boys High School in Pretoria South Africa and graduated in 2005 as First team captain and a school prefect. Brett received a Certificate in Sports Management through the University of Pretoria in 2006. In 2008 he went on to do a BCom in Transport and Logistics through the University of South Africa. After joining up with the Saints, Sharman managed to do a BA (Hons) in Business management and Leadership through the University of Northumbria and graduated in July 2013.

Academia 

2006- Certificate in Sports Management

2012- Bachelor of Commerce in Logistics

2013- BA (Hons) in Business Management and Leadership

2017- Post Graduate Diploma in Management

2018- MBA Candidate

Career 
Sharman started his career at the Blue Bulls, where he came through the youth ranks and eventually made a breakthrough into the first team. He was a regular starter from the 2007 season onwards, playing a part in the final of the Vodacom Cup which the Blue Bulls won.

In December 2008, Sharman joined Northampton Saints, following Juandré Kruger who had joined the Saints from the Bulls a few months earlier.

Although he was born in South Africa he is a qualified British citizen and holds a British passport. He has expressed a desire to play for England rugby team in the future.

Sharman deputised for Dylan Hartley from 2008-9 to 2011-12. He was capped 67 times for the Saints, scoring two tries. In January 2012, Brett suffered a career changing knee injury, which required substantial surgery on his MCL and had a patellar reconstruction.

Sharman joined Bath Rugby in September 2012 on a short term contract after being released from Northampton Saints following his long term knee injury and ongoing issues with the club due to racist Twitter posts regarding Olympic runner Mo Farah. Sharman won his first cap for Bath in the Amlin challenge cup against the Bucharest Wolves where he went to make 15 appearances for Bath. On 4 November 2014, he signed for Saracens until the end of the 2014–15 season.

Sharman is retired from rugby and living and working in South Africa.

References

External links 
Northampton Profile

South African rugby union players
Northampton Saints players
Blue Bulls players
1987 births
Living people
Saracens F.C. players
Rugby union hookers
Rugby union players from KwaZulu-Natal